Joan Mary Quennell (23 December 1923 – 2 July 2006) was a British Conservative politician who served as the Member of Parliament for Petersfield from 1960 to 1974.

Early life 
The daughter of Walter Quennell, a builder and developer, Quennell was educated at Bedales School, Petersfield, and served with the Women's Land Army during World War II.

Career 
Quennell was the manager of a mixed dairy and arable farm and served as a West Sussex County Councillor 1951–61. She was a governor of Crawley College of Further Education, and served as a J.P.

First elected to Parliament at the 1960 Petersfield by-election, Quennell had been chairman of the Horsham Divisional Conservative Association.
She stood down from parliament in the October 1974 general election, and continued to live at the family home near Rogate until her death.

Death 
Quennell died in hospital in Chichester on 2 July 2006, having had recurring bouts of poor health since suffering a stroke a few years earlier. Her remains were cremated.

Quennell bequeathed her Dangstein estate, near Rogate, to the National Trust.  In 2008, the Trust sold the estate to new owners who dismissed the staff and evicted tenants at the end of their agreements resulting in allegations that the Trust had not complied with Quennell's wishes.

Family 
Her uncle was the architect and writer C. H. B. Quennell, whose son, her cousin, was the writer Sir Peter Quennell.

References

External links 
 

1923 births
2006 deaths
Conservative Party (UK) MPs for English constituencies
People from Petersfield
Female members of the Parliament of the United Kingdom for English constituencies
UK MPs 1959–1964
UK MPs 1964–1966
UK MPs 1966–1970
UK MPs 1970–1974
UK MPs 1974
People educated at Bedales School
Councillors in West Sussex
Women's Land Army members (World War II)
20th-century British women politicians
People from Chichester District
20th-century English women
20th-century English people
Women councillors in England